The Mask of Fu Manchu (1932) is an American pre-Code adventure film directed by Charles Brabin. Written by Irene Kuhn, Edgar Allan Woolf and John Willard, it was based on the 1932 novel of the same name by Sax Rohmer (the sixth in the series). Starring Boris Karloff as Fu Manchu, and featuring Myrna Loy as his depraved daughter, the film revolves around the "Devil Doctor" 's quest for the golden sword and mask of Genghis Khan. Lewis Stone plays his nemesis. Dr. Petrie is absent from this film.

According to The Encyclopedia of Science Fiction (2011), the film "remains the best-known, and most cherished, of the early Fu Manchu films, though it was long suppressed as racially offensive".

Plot summary
Sir Denis Nayland Smith of the British Secret Service warns Egyptologist Sir Lionel Barton that he must beat Fu Manchu in the race to find the tomb of Genghis Khan. Fu Manchu intends to use the sword and mask to proclaim himself the reincarnation of the legendary conqueror and inflame the peoples of Asia and the Middle East into a war to wipe out the "white race". Sir Lionel is kidnapped soon afterward and taken to Fu Manchu. Fu Manchu tries bribing his captive, even offering his own daughter, Fah Lo See. When that fails, Barton suffers the "torture of the bell" (lying underneath a gigantic, constantly ringing bell) in an unsuccessful attempt to get him to reveal the location of the tomb.

Barton's daughter Sheila insists on taking her father's place on the expedition, as she knows where the tomb is. She finds the tomb and its treasures with the help of her fiancé Terrence "Terry" Granville, Von Berg, and McLeod. Nayland Smith joins them soon afterward.

McLeod is killed by one of Fu Manchu's men during a robbery attempt, after McLeod kills one of Fu Manchu's men. An emissary offers to trade Barton for the priceless artifacts. Despite Terry's misgivings, Sheila persuades him to take the relics to Fu Manchu without Smith's knowledge. However, when Fu Manchu tests the sword, he determines that it is a fake (Nayland had switched them). Terry is whipped under the supervision of Fah Lo See, who is attracted to him. Meanwhile, Fu Manchu has Barton's corpse delivered to Sheila. When Nayland tries to rescue Terry, he is taken captive as well.

Terry is injected with a serum that makes him temporarily obedient to Fu Manchu and released. He tells Sheila and Von Berg that Nayland Smith wants them to bring the sword and mask to him. Sheila senses something is wrong, but Von Berg digs up the real relics, and they follow Terry into a trap. Captured by Fu Manchu, the party is sentenced to death or enslavement, but not before Sheila manages to bring Terry back to his senses. Sheila is to become a human sacrifice, Nayland Smith is to be lowered into a crocodile pit, and Von Berg placed between two sets of metal spikes inching toward each other. Terry is prepared for another dose of the serum, which will make him a permanent slave of Fu Manchu's daughter. However, Nayland Smith manages to free himself, Terry, and Von Berg. Using one of Fu Manchu's own weapons—a death ray that shoots an electric current—the men incapacitate the archvillain as he raises the sword to execute Sheila. When Fu Manchu drops the sword, Terry picks it up and hacks him to death. While Terry frees Sheila and carries her away, Nayland Smith and Von Berg incinerate Fu Manchu's followers using the same weapon. Safely aboard a ship bound for England, Nayland Smith tosses the sword over the side so that the world will be safe from any future Fu Manchu.

Cast
Boris Karloff as Dr. Fu Manchu
Lewis Stone as Sir Denis Nayland Smith
Karen Morley as Sheila Barton
Charles Starrett as Terrence Granville
Myrna Loy as Fah Lo See
Jean Hersholt as Dr. Von Berg
Lawrence Grant as Sir Lionel Barton
David Torrence as McLeod
C. Montague Shaw as Curator Dr. Fairgyle (uncredited) 
E. Alyn Warren as Goy Lo Sung (uncredited)

Controversy
During its initial release, The Mask of Fu Manchu was criticized by the Republic of China and the Chinese embassy in Washington launched a formal complaint against the film for its hostile depiction of the Chinese. The speech where Fu Manchu tells his followers to "Kill the white man and take his women!" was singled out for strong criticism.

Some other critics also objected to the film's depictions of violence and sexuality. The film's re-release in 1972 was met with protest from the Japanese American Citizens League, which stated that "the movie was offensive and demeaning to Asian-Americans". Consequently, several scenes were cut for the 1992 VHS release of the film. These included the most problematical material, such as the "Kill the white man" speech, and the scenes of Fah Lo See in an orgiastic frenzy while watching Terry being whipped. The later DVD releases of the film have restored these scenes.

Release and reception
The Mask of Fu Manchu opened in New York on December 2, 1932. The film cost a total of $338,000 and had worldwide rentals of $625,000. It had a profit of $62,000.

The film is recognized by American Film Institute in these lists:
 2003: AFI's 100 Years...100 Heroes & Villains:
 Dr. Fu Manchu – Nominated Villain

See also
 Boris Karloff filmography
 Pre-Code Hollywood

References

Sources

External links

1932 films
1930s crime films
1932 adventure films
1932 horror films
American black-and-white films
Films directed by Charles Brabin
Films directed by Charles Vidor
Metro-Goldwyn-Mayer films
American adventure films
Films with screenplays by Edgar Allan Woolf
Fu Manchu films
Censored films
Self-censorship
1930s English-language films
1930s American films